Stephane Vojetta (born 19 July 1974) is a French politician who has served as the member of the National Assembly for the 5th constituency for French residents overseas since 2021. A member of La République En Marche! (LREM), he succeeded Samantha Cazebonne as her substitute following her election to the Senate.

He was re-elected in the 2022 French legislative election.

References 

1974 births
Living people
Deputies of the 15th National Assembly of the French Fifth Republic
21st-century French politicians
La République En Marche! politicians

Politicians from Nancy, France
Deputies of the 16th National Assembly of the French Fifth Republic
Members of Parliament for French people living outside France